Charlie Murphy's Crash Comedy is a web sketch comedy series of four-to-five-minute episodes, created by Charlie Murphy and consisting of sketches, parodies and infomercials. Crash Comedy is a production of Iron Weeds Productions and is distributed by Sony Pictures Television. Co-starring with Murphy are Donnell Rawlings and Freez Luv. The series premiered on March 16, 2009, on the streaming platform Crackle, with new episodes uploaded each Friday until June 12.

History
Murphy became well known as a comedian after appearing on Chappelle's Show (with his Crash Comedy co-star Donnell Rawlings). One of his sketches, "Charlie Murphy's True Hollywood Stories" involved him telling and acting out stories involving various celebrities. Since Chappelle's Show ended in 2006, Murphy felt like no other sketch show was filling the void that was left by the show's exit. He believed Crash Comedy would, saying it's "sketch comedy without restrictions."

Cast
Charlie Murphy
Donnell Rawlings
Freez Luv
Jay Pharoah

Episodes

Season 1

References

External links
 Charlie Murphy's Crash Comedy
 
 
 

American comedy web series